The UP Makalu is a German single-place paraglider that was designed and produced by UP Europe of Kochel am See. Introduced in 2001, production of the final version ended in 2016.

Design and development
The Makalu was designed as a basic intermediate glider and named for the mountain of the same name.

The design progressed through several generations of models, the Makalu, Makalu 2 and Makalu 3. The models are each named for their relative size.

The original generation Makalu's sail was made from Porsher Marine New Skytex and its lines were fabricated from Cousin Trestec Super Aramid.

Variants

Makalu
Produced from 2001-2003.
Makalu XS
Extra small-sized model for lighter pilots. The glider model is Deutscher Hängegleiterverband e.V. (DHV) 1-2 certified.
Makalu S
Small-sized model for lighter pilots. The glider model is DHV 1-2 certified.
Makalu M
Mid-sized model for medium-weight pilots. The glider model is DHV 1-2 certified.
Makalu L
Large-sized model for heavier pilots. The glider model is DHV 1-2 certified.
Makalu XL
Extra large-sized model for heavier pilots and two-place tandem use. The glider model is DHV 1-2 certified.

Makalu 2
Produced from 2004-2006.
Makalu 2 XS
Extra small-sized model for lighter pilots. The glider model is DHV 1-2 certified.
Makalu 2 S
Small-sized model for lighter pilots. The glider model is DHV 1-2 certified.
Makalu 2 M
Mid-sized model for medium-weight pilots. The glider model is DHV 1-2 certified.
Makalu 2 L
Large-sized model for heavier pilots. The glider model is DHV 1-2 certified.
Makalu 2 XL
Extra large-sized model for much heavier pilots. The glider model is DHV 1-2 certified.

Makalu 3
Produced from 2012-2016.
Makalu 3 XS
Extra small-sized model for lighter pilots. The glider model is DHV LTF/EN B certified.
Makalu 3 S
Small-sized model for lighter pilots. The glider model is DHV LTF/EN B certified.
Makalu 3 M
Mid-sized model for medium-weight pilots. The glider model is DHV LTF/EN B certified.
Makalu 3 L
Large-sized model for heavier pilots. The glider model is DHV LTF/EN B certified.

Makalu 4
Prduced 2018 and on.
Makalu 4 XS
Extra-small-sized model for lighter pilots. The glider model is DHV LTF/EN B certified.
Makalu 4 S
Small-sized model for lighter pilots. The glider model is DHV LTF/EN B certified.
Makalu 4 S/M
Small-medium-sized model for mid-weight pilots. The glider model is DHV LTF/EN B certified.
Makalu 4 M
Medium-sized model for mid-weight pilots. The glider model is DHV LTF/EN B certified.
Makalu 4 L
Large-sized model for heavier pilots. The glider model is DHV LTF/EN B certified.

Specifications (Makalu M)

References

External links

Makalu
Paragliders